Ronald Roe Messner  (born August 1, 1935) is an American building contractor who has built more than 1,700 churches, including several megachurches.

Having divorced his first wife, he married televangelist Tammy Faye Bakker in 1993 after her divorce from husband and PTL Club founder Jim Bakker.

Early life 
Messner grew up in Waldron, Kansas, on the Kansas-Oklahoma border. He founded Messner Construction in  Andover, Kansas, and began building churches.

Heritage USA 
Roe Messner gained fame with the construction of Heritage USA in 1978 at the behest of Jim Bakker. In 1987, he and his first wife, Ruth Ann, wrote a book titled Building for the Master. He reportedly played a behind-the-scenes role in the downfall of the PTL Club. He was reportedly the person who produced the money for the $265,000 payment to Jessica Hahn to cover up a sexual assault. Messner later billed PTL for work never completed on the Jerusalem Amphitheater at Heritage USA.

Revelations of the payoff invited scrutiny of Bakker's finances, prompting him to be charged with fraud. In the Bakkers' fraud trial, Messner testified for Bakker's defense, saying that Jerry Falwell had attempted to take over PTL and its associated cable television network by dispatching Messner to the Bakker home in Palm Springs, California, to make an offer to "keep quiet".

According to Messner's testimony, Tammy wrote the offer on her stationery, listing a $300,000-a-year lifetime salary for Jim, $100,000 a year for Tammy, a house, and a year's worth of free phone calls and health insurance. However, Messner said Bakker wrote on it: "I'm not making any demands on PTL. I'm not asking for anything." Falwell has denied making any offer. In the messy bankruptcy of PTL, Messner was listed as the single biggest creditor of PTL with an outstanding claim of $14 million. In court papers, the new operators accused Messner of $5.3 million in inflated or phony billings to PTL.

Marriage to Tammy Faye 
Messner divorced his first wife in 1993. At about the same time, Tammy Faye divorced Bakker. Messner and Tammy Faye were married in and lived in Rancho Mirage, California.

In 1996, Roe was convicted of bankruptcy fraud, having claimed to owe nearly $30 million to over 300 creditors in 1990. As he faced sentencing in 1996, he said he could not afford to treat his prostate cancer because he lacked health insurance. He was sentenced to and served 27 months in prison.

Messner published Church Growth by Design, another book on church building, in 2003.

Tammy Faye Messner's death 
Messner and Tammy Faye moved to the gated community of Loch Lloyd, Missouri, a suburb of Kansas City, in 2007. Tammy Faye died from cancer on July 20 that year; her last public appearance was a taped interview on CNN from their home the day before. Her ashes were interred in the Messner family plot in Waldron, immediately next to Messner's mother.

Roe Messner himself is known to have received a diagnosis of prostate cancer in the past, though he told Larry King that his doctors had told him that he would not die from the disease.

Notable churches

Messner is reported to have been the biggest church builder in the United States.  On August 7, 2007, he told Larry King that he had built 1,784 churches in 47 states. Messner supervised construction of the churches but was not the architect. He has designed and/or built over 1,800 churches in all 50 states.
Calvary Temple (1958) - Denver, Colorado
Pleasant Valley Methodist (1960) - Wichita, Kansas
Oak Cliff Assembly of God (1963) - Dallas, Texas
Evangelical United Brethren (1967) - Marion, Kansas	
World Harvest Church (1983) - Columbus, Ohio
Dream City Church (1984) - Phoenix, Arizona
Rockford First Assembly of God (1984) - Rockford, Illinois
Capitol Christian Center (1984) - Sacramento, California
Hillside Christian Center (1986) - Napa, California
Carpenter's Home Church (1986) - Lakeland, Florida
Church on the Rock (1986) - Rockwall, Texas
Bethel Church - Los Angeles, California
Calvary Church (Charlotte) (1988) - Charlotte, North Carolina
Bellevue Baptist Church (1989) - Memphis, Tennessee
Cathedral of the Holy Spirit (1989) - Decatur, Georgia
The Gate Church (1990) - Oklahoma City, Oklahoma
Deliverance Church (1990) - Philadelphia, Pennsylvania
Central Community Church (1990) - Wichita, Kansas
Point Harbor Community Church (2003) - Chesapeake, Virginia
Redemption (2003) - Greenville, South Carolina

References

External links
Roe Messner & Associates, Inc. website

1935 births
American construction businesspeople
American businesspeople convicted of crimes
American people convicted of fraud
People from Harper County, Kansas
Businesspeople from Charlotte, North Carolina
People from Cass County, Missouri
People from Rancho Mirage, California
Living people
Place of birth missing (living people)
Prisoners and detainees of the United States federal government